The Jhangar Phase was an archaeological culture, named after the type site Jhangar, that followed the Jhukar Phase of the Late Harappan culture in Sindh (i.e., the Lower Indus Valley).

Jhukar and Jhangar phases are collectively called  Jhukar and Jhangar culture (1900 - 1500 BCE). Cemetery H culture (subculture of Late Harrapan IVC Phase) in Punjab was contemporaneous to Jhukar-Jhangar culture (subculture of Late Harrapan IVC Phase) in Sindh, both have evidence of continuity and change. Rangpur culture in Gujarat, also part of Late Phase of IVC, was also contemporaneous to both.

It is a non-urban culture, characterised by "crude handmade pottery" and "campsites of a population which was nomadic and mainly pastoralist," and is dated to approximately the late second millennium BCE and early first millennium BCE. In Sindh, urban growth began again after approximately 500 BCE.

See also

 Chronological dating
 Phases in archaeology
 Pottery in the Indian subcontinent

 Periodisation of the Indus Valley civilisation
 Ahar-Banas culture (3000 – 1500 BCE)
 Late Harappan Phase of IVC (1900 - 1500 BCE)
 Cemetery H culture in Punjab
 Jhukar-Jhangar culture in Punjab
 Rangpur culture in Gujarat

 Vedic period
 Kuru Kingdom (1200 – c. 500 BCE)
 OCP (2000-1500 BCE) 
 Copper Hoard culture (2800-1500 BCE), may or may not be independent of vedic culture

References

Bronze Age Asia
Prehistoric India
History of Pakistan